Robin Graham may refer to:
Robin Ann Graham (born 1952), American college student missing since 1970
Robin Lee Graham (born 1949), American sailor
C. Robin Graham, American mathematician